This is a list of the National Register of Historic Places listings in Spokane County, Washington.

This is intended to be a complete list of the properties and districts on the National Register of Historic Places in Spokane County, Washington, United States. Latitude and longitude coordinates are provided for many National Register properties and districts; these locations may be seen together in an online map.

There are 154 properties and districts listed on the National Register in the county. 131 of these properties and districts are located within the city of Spokane, while the remaining 23 properties and districts are located elsewhere. Another 2 properties were once listed but have been removed.

Listings (exclusive of Spokane)

|}

Spokane

|}

Former listings

|}

See also

 List of National Historic Landmarks in Washington
 National Register of Historic Places listings in Washington state

References

External links
Spokane Register of Historic Places by the City-County Historic Preservation Office
Spokane Preservation Advocates
 House History records at the Spokane Public Library Inland Northwest Special Collection

 
Spokane